Notre-Dame-du-Sacré-Cœur-d'Issoudun is a parish municipality in the Lotbinière Regional County Municipality in the Chaudière-Appalaches region of Quebec, Canada. Its population is 869 as of the Canada 2011 Census.  It is simply known as Issoudun, given the length of the official name.

The name honours the origin of a group of Missionaries of the Sacred Heart who came to Quebec City in 1900, from Issoudun, France.

On August 11, 1957, Maritime Central Airways Flight 315 crashed near Issoudun, killing 79 people.

Demographics 

References

External links

Commission de toponymie du Québec
Ministère des Affaires municipales, des Régions et de l'Occupation du territoire

Parish municipalities in Quebec
Incorporated places in Chaudière-Appalaches
Lotbinière Regional County Municipality